State Route 128 (SR 128) is a state highway in the U.S. state of California, connecting the Mendocino coast to the Sacramento Valley, through the state's Wine Country. It runs from State Route 1 near Albion to Interstate 505 in Winters.

Route description

Route 128 begins at Route 1 near the mouth of the Navarro River at the Pacific Ocean. The highway travels southeast and upriver, through the coast redwood forests of Navarro River Redwoods State Park and through the vineyards and apple orchards of the Anderson Valley, to Boonville. Route 253, from Ukiah, has its western terminus into Route 128 at the south end of Boonville.  Leaving Boonville, Route 128 climbs out of the Navarro River watershed and crosses the Yorkville Highlands before descending into the Russian River watershed, arriving at Cloverdale in the Alexander Valley, where the highway joins U.S. Route 101 heading south.

A few miles later, at Geyserville, Route 128 separates from U.S. 101 and continues southeast through Knights Valley on the way to Napa Valley, where it joins Route 29 at Calistoga. After passing through the town of St. Helena, Route 128 splits from Route 29 at Rutherford and climbs east over dry ridges above Lake Berryessa to the Sacramento Valley. In Winters, the route's constructed portion ends at Interstate 505.

The section of Route 128 through Navarro River Redwoods State Park is often closed in winter storms due to flooding. Two slower alternate routes are available: the Philo-Greenwood road connects Route 1 near Elk to Route 128 near Hendy Woods State Park, a few miles north of Philo; another alternate route is the Comptche-Ukiah Road, which intersects Route 1 just south of the town of Mendocino and runs inland to Comptche, and departs Comptche on Flynn Creek Road, intersecting Route 128 just up river from the seasonal flood gate closing the highway.

SR 128 is part of the California Freeway and Expressway System, although it is mostly 2 lanes, but except for a small portion in Winters is not part of the National Highway System, a network of highways that are considered essential to the country's economy, defense, and mobility by the Federal Highway Administration.

History
The main road through the Anderson Valley to the mouth of the Navarro River, and from there up the coast to Fort Bragg, was originally called the Navarro Highway; it follows the approximate route of the present Route 128 and Route 1 through Mendocino County. Even earlier, the road followed the Navarro Ridge, to the north of the present alignment, instead of staying at the river level. By 1938, the last stretches of old winding roadway near the present location of Navarro were replaced by a straighter alignment, taken over from a disused logging railway line.

Before being numbered as California State Route 128, the highway was signed as State Route 28. In 1952 it was renumbered State Route 128, permitting a different highway around Lake Tahoe to be numbered as Route 28 to coordinate its numbering with Nevada Route 28.

Major intersections

See also

References

External links

California @ AARoads - State Route 128
Caltrans: Route 128 highway conditions
California Highways: SR 128

128
State Route 128
State Route 128
State Route 128
State Route 128
State Route 128
Mayacamas Mountains
Napa Valley
Vaca Mountains
Winters, California
Wineries in Napa Valley